Let's all Get Together is the fifth studio album by Australian musician Ian Moss. The album was released in July 2007 and is Moss' second acoustic album following Six Strings in 2005.

Reception
Brett Winterford from Sydney Morning Herald said "The album finds Moss in fine voice - better than in his Cold Chisel days." adding "but the album does lack some of the magic he is nostalgic for -something that only sparked when Cold Chisel's five sometimes-volatile characters were in the same room."

JB HiFi said "Never has there been a more intriguing and satisfying fusion of rock, soul, jazz and blues and it’s all delivered in Mossy’s trademark laid-back style."

Track listing

Charts

Personnel
Ian Moss - Vocals, Guitar

References

2007 albums
Liberation Records albums
Ian Moss albums